is a Japanese judoka. He won a silver medal in mixed team, at the 2020 Olympics held in Tokyo, Japan.

Career
He participated at the 2018 World Judo Championships, winning a medal.

References

External links
 

1996 births
Living people
Japanese male judoka
World judo champions
Universiade gold medalists for Japan
Universiade bronze medalists for Japan
Universiade medalists in judo
Medalists at the 2017 Summer Universiade
Judoka at the 2020 Summer Olympics
Olympic silver medalists for Japan
Olympic judoka of Japan
Medalists at the 2020 Summer Olympics
Olympic medalists in judo
21st-century Japanese people